Andrew Jackson Poppleton (July 24, 1830 – September 9, 1896) was a lawyer and politician in pioneer Omaha, Nebraska. Serving in a variety of roles over his lifetime, his name is present throughout many of the important events of early Omaha history.

Background
Born in Troy, Michigan, Poppleton went to Romeo Academy. He then went to the University of Michigan. In 1851, Poppleton graduated from Union College. He was admitted to the Michigan bar in 1852. In 1854, Poppleton moved to Omaha, Nebraska Territory. Poppleton practiced law in Omaha and was involved with the Democratic Party.

Career
Poppleton served in many political roles in pioneer Omaha. One of the founders of the Omaha Claim Club, Poppleton was also heavily involved in the enforcement of its rules over the city. When the club went to the U.S. Supreme Court, it was Poppleton who mounted the defense. They lost. Poppleton was a member of the Nebraska Territorial Legislature in 1854–55 and 1857–58. In a fluke in 1857, Poppleton served as the Speaker of the House of Representatives in the Nebraska Territorial Legislature. After that, he was the second mayor of young Omaha, serving for six months from March 2, 1858, until September 14, 1858, when he resigned from office. Poppleton was afterwards an influential real estate businessman and lawyer in Omaha.

Poppleton worked for many years as the general attorney for the Union Pacific Railroad. The most important case he ever argued was the 1879 trial of Standing Bear v. Crook, held at Fort Omaha. Standing Bear, a Ponca chief, successfully argued in U.S. District Court that Native Americans are "persons within the meaning of the law" and have the rights of citizenship.

Personal life
Poppleton died in 1896 and was interred at the Prospect Hill Cemetery in North Omaha. Poppleton Avenue in Omaha is named in his honor; the Poppleton Block in Downtown Omaha is listed on the National Register of Historic Places.

See also

 History of Omaha

References

External links
 

1830 births
1896 deaths
People from Troy, Michigan
Union College (New York) alumni
University of Michigan alumni
Michigan lawyers
Nebraska lawyers
Businesspeople from Omaha, Nebraska
Nebraska Democrats
Members of the Nebraska Territorial Legislature
Mayors of Omaha, Nebraska
Burials at Prospect Hill Cemetery (North Omaha, Nebraska)
19th-century American politicians
19th-century American businesspeople
19th-century American lawyers